The 2016–17 season is Swindon Town's 138th season in their existence and their fifth consecutive season in League One. Along with competing in League One, the club will also participate in the FA Cup, EFL Cup and EFL Trophy. The season covers the period from 1 July 2016 to 30 June 2017.

Players

First team squad

Transfers

In

Out

Loans in

Loans out

Friendlies

Pre-season friendlies
On 13 May 2016, Woking announced that they would be hosting Swindon Town in a pre-season friendly.

Competitions

Overview

{| class="wikitable" style="text-align: center"
|-
!rowspan=2|Competition
!colspan=8|Record
|-
!
!
!
!
!
!
!
!
|-
| League One

|-
| FA Cup

|-
| EFL Cup

|-
| EFL Trophy

|-
! Total

League One

League table

Results summary

Matches

On 22 June 2016, the fixtures for the forthcoming season were announced.

FA Cup

EFL Cup

EFL Trophy

Group stage

Knockout phase

Statistics

Appearances

Top scorers
The list is sorted by shirt number when total goals are equal.

Clean sheets
The list is sorted by shirt number when total appearances are equal.

Summary

References

External links
 Swindon Town F.C.
 Total Sport
 BBC Sport
 Sky Sports
 Soccerbase

Swindon Town
Swindon Town F.C. seasons